Krishnapuram may refer to places in India:

 Krishnapuram, Vizianagaram district, Andhra Pradesh
 Krishnapuram, Krishna district, Andhra Pradesh
 Krishnapuram, Alappuzha district, Kerala
 Krishnapuram, Thrissur, Kerala
 Krishnapuram, Thanjavur district, Tamil Nadu
 Krishnapuram, Virudhunagar district, Tamil Nadu
 Krishnapuram - the original name of village Krushnur in Nanded District of Maharashtra